Shaw Blades is an American musical duo/group formed by Tommy Shaw of Styx and Jack Blades of Night Ranger, both of whom played in the supergroup Damn Yankees.  It is an informal duo which has produced two albums between other projects, 1995's Hallucination and 2007's Influence.  The first two songs on "Hallucination" -- "My Hallucination" and "I'll Always Be with You"—received modest airplay.  "Influence" consisted solely of 1960s and 1970s cover songs that influenced them.  Blades' son Colin, a songwriter himself, contributed backing vocals and arrangements to the album.   Shaw Blades also recorded a cover of the classic Christmas song "The Twelve Days of Christmas" on the A Classic Rock Christmas album by various classic rock artists in 2002.  Shaw Blades did a short tour of America in Spring 2007 and another in Autumn 2007.  Both members still principally record and perform with the acts which made them famous. From 2007 to 2009, they were joined on tour by Will Evankovich on the request of Blades, who had seen Evankovich’s band American Drag perform and wanted him to join them on acoustic,12-string, harmonica and background vocals.

Discography

Hallucination

Musicians

Jack Blades – Vocals, Bass, Percussion, Acoustic Guitar on "The End"
Tommy Shaw – Vocals, Guitars, Keyboards, Percussion
Steve Smith – Drums
The Neverleave Brothers – Backing Vocals
Michael Cartellone – Drums (Tracks 4, 6, 7)

Production

Tommy Shaw – Producer
Jack Blades – Producer
Don Gehman – Producer, Mixer, Recorder
Eddy Schreyer – Mastering
Neil King – Production Engineer
Jeff Lord-Alge – Production Engineer
Jim Goodwin – Assistant Engineer
Janet Levinson – Art Direction/Design
Reisig & Taylor – Photography
Cory Jacobs – Studio & Musicians Photos

Influence

Musicians
Jack Blades – Acoustic Guitar, Percussion, Vocals
Tommy Shaw – Electric & Acoustic Guitars, Keyboards, Percussion, Vocals
Michael Lardie – Keyboards
Brian Tichy – Drums
Kelly Keagy – Drums on "Dirty Work"
Ben Krames – Drums on "Time of the Season"
Colin Blades – Backing Vocals on "Your Move"
Randy Mitchell – Loops

Production

Tommy Shaw – Producer
Jack Blades – Producer
Michael Lardie – Engineer, Mixer
Noel Golden – Mixer
Dave Donelly – Mastering
John Kalodner – Mastering
Diane Burk – Album Coordination
Leslie Langlo – Album Coordination
Jeanne Shaw – Photos
Jennifer Starr – Photos
Scott Rosen – Photos

Track information and credits verified from the album's liner notes.

In other media

"California Dreamin'" was used at the end of the last episode of season 2 of the TV show Californication.

"My Hallucination" was used in the movie Tommy Boy.

References

External links
The Official Shaw Blades site archived at the Internet Archive

American rock music groups
American musical duos
Rock music duos